Jeri Lynn Mooney (born January 28, 1944), better known as Susan Howard, is an American actress, writer, and political activist. She portrayed Donna Culver Krebbs on Dallas (1979–1987) and co-starred on Petrocelli (1974–1976). She is also a screenwriter and member of the Writers Guild of America.

Biography
Jeri Lynn Mooney was born on January 28, 1944, in Marshall, Texas, to parents Cassell C. and Melba Ruth "Peg" Mooney. She had an older brother, James. Her family is of Irish ancestry from Cork. Mooney was recognized for her acting talent while growing up in Marshall. She won a University Interscholastic League award for Best Actress while in high school. Upon graduating from Marshall High School in 1960, she attended the University of Texas for two years, where she studied drama and was a member of the Gamma Phi Beta sorority, before leaving for Los Angeles to become an acting student at the Los Angeles Repertory Company. She later took the stage name Susan Howard as her father had nicknamed her Susie and Howard was a family name.

Television
Howard had a number of notable guest appearances on television shows during the 1960s and early 1970s: The Flying Nun (1967), I Dream of Jeannie (1968), Star Trek ‘’Day of the Dove’’ (1968), Bonanza (1969), Mannix (1969), Mission: Impossible (1972), and Columbo (1972). She played the first female Klingon ("Mara") on the original Star Trek series and the only one to ever speak.

In 1973, she appeared as Evan Sands on Lorne Greene's series Griff in the episode "Who Framed Billy the Kid?", with Nick Nolte as Billy Randolph.

In 1974, Howard was cast as the co-star of the series Petrocelli. Her performance was nominated for both the Golden Globe and Emmy awards. Despite critical acclaim for Howard, the series was cancelled in 1976.

In 1978, Howard played a key role as Professor Kingsfield's daughter Susan in season 1, episode 10 of The Paper Chase. In 1979, she appeared on Dallas as Donna Culver. The producers of the show liked her performance so much that her guest spot was expanded to an eight-year stint; she has the distinction of being the only Dallas cast member to have written for the series ("Sitting Ducks" and "The Ten Percent Solution"). In 1987, the show decided to not renew her contract. She has blamed this decision on her opposition to what she saw as pro-abortion stories involving her character.

Personal life
Howard was married to actor Charles Howerton from 1962 to 1964. They had one daughter, Lynn. In 1974, she married independent film executive Calvin Chrane. She and her husband have lived in Boerne, Texas, since 1998.

She is a member of the Writers Guild of America and wrote two episodes of Dallas.

Politics
Since leaving television, Howard has become an increasingly active supporter of conservative causes, especially for gun rights. In 1989, she was co-host of The 700 Club. Howard has been active in the leadership of both the National Rifle Association and the Texas Republican Party. Howard has served as a commissioner of the Texas Parks and Wildlife Department and the Texas Commission on the Arts. She became involved in the NRA after meeting Executive Vice President Wayne LaPierre at the 1988 Republican National Convention in New Orleans.

Filmography

Film

Television

Awards and nominations

See also
 "Day of the Dove"

References

Bibliography
 Featured prominently in the book Petrocelli: San Remo Justice: An Episode Guide and Much More by Sandra Grabman, published 2018 by BearManor Media

External links
 

1944 births
American gun rights activists
American people of Irish descent
American soap opera actresses
American television actresses
Living people
People from Marshall, Texas
Texas Republicans
University of Texas at Austin alumni
Women in Texas politics
Activists from Texas
20th-century American actresses
21st-century American women